Jeong Sang-eun (born 2 April 1990) is a Chinese-South Korean table tennis player. An ethnic Korean born in China, he became a naturalized South Korean in 2005.

Achievements

Major events
Men's singles

ITTF Tours
Men's singles

Men's doubles

References

Table tennis players from Jilin
People from Wangqing County
1990 births
Living people
Chinese male table tennis players
South Korean male table tennis players
Chinese emigrants to South Korea
Naturalised table tennis players
Naturalized citizens of South Korea
Table tennis players at the 2014 Asian Games
Medalists at the 2014 Asian Games
Asian Games silver medalists for South Korea
Chinese people of Korean descent
Asian Games medalists in table tennis